The Pyongyang Metro Hyoksin Line is a rapid transit line owned and operated by Pyongyang Metro in Pyongyang, North Korea.

The location of the depot seems to be to the west of Kwangbok station, although where it actually is located is unknown.

Stations

References 

Hyoksin Line
Railway lines opened in 1978
1978 establishments in North Korea